Lewis Baker (born October 12, 1984) is a former gridiron football safety who played for the Las Vegas Locomotives of the United Football League (UFL). He also was a member of the Hamilton Tiger-Cats of the Canadian Football League (CFL).

Professional career

San Francisco 49ers
After going unselected in the 2008 NFL Draft, Baker was signed by the San Francisco 49ers as an undrafted free agent. He was released prior to the start of the regular season. Baker was re-signed by the team in March 2009, only to be released on July 24.

Hamilton Tiger-Cats
Baker was signed by the Hamilton Tiger-Cats of the Canadian Football League (CFL) on October 8, 2009. He spent the season on the practice roster, and did not make any appearances. He was released in early .

Las Vegas Locomotives
After being released by the Tiger-Cats, Baker was signed by the Las Vegas Locomotives in the United Football League (UFL). He appeared in six games during the 2010 season, and was a member of their league championship team. He played appeared in four games the following season before being released, ending his professional career.

References

External links
 Oklahoma Sooners bio

1984 births
Living people
People from Carrollton, Texas
Players of American football from Texas
American football linebackers
American football safeties
Canadian football defensive backs
American players of Canadian football
Oklahoma Sooners football players
San Francisco 49ers players
Hamilton Tiger-Cats players
Las Vegas Locomotives players
Players of Canadian football from Texas